Josef Gingold (January 11, 1995) was a Russian-born American classical violinist and teacher who lived most of his life in the United States. At the time of his death he was considered one of the most influential violin masters in the United States, with many successful students.

Biography

Gingold was born to a Jewish family in Brest-Litovsk, Grodno Governorate, Russian Empire (now Brest, Belarus), and emigrated in 1920 to the United States where he studied violin with Vladimir Graffman in New York City. He then moved to Belgium for several years to study with master violinist Eugène Ysaÿe. He gave the first performance of Ysaÿe's 3rd Sonata for Solo Violin. 

In 1937, Gingold won a spot in the NBC Symphony Orchestra, with Arturo Toscanini as its conductor. While at NBC, Gingold was a founding member of its associated chamber ensembles, the Primrose Quartet (with first violinist Josef Fuchs, violist William Primrose, and cellist Harvey Shapiro) and the NBC Trio (with Shapiro and pianist Earl Wild). Gingold later served as the concertmaster (and occasional soloist) of the Detroit Symphony Orchestra, and later was the Cleveland Orchestra's concertmaster under conductor George Szell.

Gingold edited numerous violin technique books and orchestral excerpt collections. He taught at the Indiana University Jacobs School of Music for more than thirty years, until his death in 1995. His pupils included Gil Shaham, Joshua Bell,  Christoph Poppen, Sally O'Reilly, Arnold Steinhardt, Martin Beaver, Shony Alex Braun, Andrés Cárdenes, Corey Cerovsek, Cyrus Forough, Miriam Fried, Philippe Graffin, Endre Granat, Ulf Hoelscher, Hu Nai-yuan, Jacques Israelievitch, Leonidas Kavakos, Chin Kim, Salvatore Greco, Jaime Laredo, William Preucil, Joseph Silverstein, Lucie Robert, and Gwen Thompson.

Gingold had a number of teaching assistants who continued to develop their own teaching careers. His last teaching assistant was Canadian Anne Shih, now Professor of Violin at the Musikhochschule Rheinland-Pfalz at the University of Mainz in Germany. Prior to this she was Professor of Violin at Oberlin Conservatory and the Lawrence University Conservatory of Music in the USA.

Anne Shih's sister, Patricia Shih, was the only student chosen by Gingold to perform for his 75th birthday celebration show on national television for Charles Kuralt viewed by millions across America. She is the founder of the Borealis Quartet.  And, she is a professor of violin at Baylor University in Texas.

Gingold was a founder of the quadrennial Indianapolis Violin Competition. He was a National Patron of Delta Omicron, an international professional music fraternity.

A detailed literary portrait of Josef Gingold is included in the book, Quintet, Five Journeys toward Musical Fulfillment, by David Blum (Cornell University Press, 1999). It originally appeared as an article in the February 4, 1991, issue of The New Yorker.

Gingold died in Bloomington, Indiana, in 1995, aged 85.

Honors and awards

Gingold's recording of Fritz Kreisler's works was nominated for a Grammy Award. Some of the numerous honors he received during his lifetime include the American String Teachers Association Teacher of the Year; the Fredrick Bachman Lieber Award for Distinguished Teaching at Indiana University; the Chamber Music America National Service Award; Baylor University's Robert Foster Cherry Award for Great Teachers; and the American Symphony Orchestra League's Golden Baton Award.

Discography

The discography of Josef Gingold is limited.
 The Primrose Quartet CD (Biddulph Recordings LAB052-53) reissue of the 1940-1941 78 rpm recordings, with Josef Gingold, William Primrose, Harvey Shapiro, Oscar Shumsky, and Jesus Maria Sanroma of Toscanini's NBC Symphony Orchestra, performing works of Haydn, Schumann, Brahms, Smetana, and Tchaikovsky.
 "Joseph Gingold Seventyfive", recordings from 1942–1968, including Walton's Sonata for VIolin and Piano, 1984 vinyl LP (Red Bud RB-1017).
 Josef Gingold Plays Fritz Kreisler, a 1976 vinyl LP record.
 Gingold's 1973 recording of Kodaly's Duo with cellist Janos Starker, originally released on the LP (Fidelio F-003), reissued in 1992 on the CD Starker Plays Kodaly, and in 2007 on SACD (TM-SACD 9002.2) and on vinyl LP by Hong Kong label TopMusic International.
 Schubert's Sonatina in A minor, D385, and Liszt's Rapsodie Espagnole, with Gyorgy Sebok (piano) on LP (IND-722, Indiana University School of Music).
 The Art of Josef Gingold, a transfer to CD of the 1976 recording and a 1966 recording, by Music and Arts in 1989, and reissued in 2007 by Pristine Classical.
 The Artistry of Josef Gingold, a two-CD set on Enharmonic ENCD03-015 contains otherwise unavailable performances of music by Bloch, Arensky, Beethoven (a live recording of the Concerto from Ohio State), Francaix, Mozart, Schubert, Tchaikovsky and Ysaye.

Notes

Sources

"Joseph Gingold" - International Violin Competition of Indianapolis 

Violin pedagogues
Jacobs School of Music faculty
American classical violinists
Male classical violinists
American male violinists
Concertmasters
Jewish classical violinists
Jewish American classical musicians
American people of Belarusian-Jewish descent 
Polish emigrants to the United States
Jews from the Russian Empire
1909 births
1995 deaths
20th-century classical violinists
20th-century American male musicians
20th-century American Jews
20th-century American violinists